Masahiko Metoki is a Japanese politician who is serving as Director General of Universal Postal Union, Agency of United Nations from January 2022.

References 

Universal Postal Union
Universal Postal Union people